brickOS is an open-source operating system created by Markus Noga as firmware to operate as an alternative software environment for the Lego Mindstorms Robotic Invention System [14]. brickOS is the first open-source software made for Lego Mindstorms robots. It is embedded with a C/C++-based and a Java-based environment for RCX program through utilizing g++ and jack toolchain. It uses a Hitachi H8 cross compiler assembler as its primary toolchain.

The operating system comprises demonstration programs implemented in C and C++ and an alternative operating system for the Lego Mindstorms. It provides users with utilities that allows them to download compiled programs and install the operating system for RCX.

Features
BrickOS was designed and developed using Linux as a replacement for the previous operating system for Lego Mindstorms, which is also known as LegOS. It is capable of being implemented on the Windows system and most Unices [6]. It allows for a more flexible and higher performances system that is much superior to LegOS [3]. The current version of the system's main features includes [3]:

BrickOS programs are executed natively instead of interpreted bytes code [12] like that of a standard firmware which in terms makes the program faster. BrickOS is flexible with controlling outputs [2], for instance, it can alter 255 value of motor speed. Another feature is that brickOS contains a LegOS Network Protocol (LNP) which allows for more than one driver to communicate. This protocol will broadcast message to any RCXs component within the receiving area. By adding layers to the command, the message can filter out the recipient to arrive at the addressed RCX.

BrickOS provides a development environment that allows users to freely implement the provided RCX drivers, such as sensors and motors, using C or C++ programming languages. It can be used alongside libre simulators LegoSim and Emmulegos, which provide graphical interfaces to create a virtual machine that eases the users in the debugging process. 
The success of the system is built upon the community that constructed it. The system library and resources at any moment can be modified and updated freely with new functionalities and solutions from the programming community, separating the system from the limited tools provided by the manufacturer. With the help of the Internet, solutions are made accessible to everyone.

Application

Robotics 

The implementation of robots has become a crucial asset in this current industrial world. In robotics, libre software (or open-source software) like brickOS is considered a traditional tool for developing robots [1]. The potential robotic application, in general, is vast. For instance, many enterprises have decided to bring robotics into use to replace human labor in factories for manufacturing products and managing storage. The essential of these applications has become a motivation for industries to invest in further research in robotics. 
The practices of the open-source software in robotic research have inspired the formation of the Robocup competition. An organization called Robocup have created an international playground for the problem-solving, educational initiative, and research in robotics. Participants are allowed to share code and utilize it to solve problems. The competitive environment allows for multiple different engagements toward the problems and effectively produces alternative solutions to a single problem. These solutions can be made public to the community for improving the resource.

Education 
BrickOS was a collaboration project between LEGO and MIT to create an educational tool for teaching the implementation of sensors and motors on robots. The operating system's development environment has been adopted in courses by several universities like Universidade Federal do Amazonas (UFA) in Brazil to be used as a platform for graduating college students to gain exposure in the early year of their career to programming C and C++ cross-compilation tools. The simplicity of the mechanical devices in the Lego Mindstorm kit allows for obtaining the concept of robots and developing creative and logical thinking. There exists empirical evaluation on the benefits of robotic learning that it enhanced pupil's ability in planning toward the objective and collaborations among peers [10].

See also

 Lego Mindstorms
 List of operating systems

References
 	Barrera, P., Robles, G., Canas, J. M., Martín, F., & Matellán, V. (2005). Impact of libre software tools and methods in the robotics field. ACM SIGSOFT Software Engineering Notes, 30(4), 1–6. Retrieved from: https://www.researchgate.net/profile/Francisco-Martin-4/publication/220630637_Impact_of_Libre_Software_Tools_and_Methods_in_the_Robotics_Field/links/0fcfd50aca8cc1014e000000/Impact-of-Libre-Software-Tools-and-Methods-in-the-Robotics-Field.pdf  (Accessed 12 March 2022)
 	Babu, V. D. H., & Boyuka, D. Object Transportation System Using LEGO Mindstorms RCX. Retrieved from: https://arcb.csc.ncsu.edu/~mueller/rt/rt11/readings/projects/g2/project3.pdf (Accessed 10 April 2022) 
 	Delman, A., Goetz, L., Langsam, Y., & Raphan, T. (2009, July). Development of a System for Teaching C/C++ Using Robots and Open-Source Software in a CS1 Course. In FECS (pp. 141–146). Retrieved from: https://www.researchgate.net/profile/Yedidyah-Langsam/publication/220844040_Development_of_a_System_for_Teaching_CC_Using_Robots_and_Open_Source_Software_in_a_CS1_Course/links/54eb20a80cf2f7aa4d5a4192/Development-of-a-System-for-Teaching-C-C-Using-Robots-and-Open-Source-Software-in-a-CS1-Course.pdf  (Accessed 12 March 2022)
 	Gawthrop, P. J., & McGookin, E. (2006, June). Using LEGO in control education. In Proc. 7th IFAC Symp. Advances in Control Education (pp. 31–38). Retrieved from: https://www.gawthrop.net/Lego/ACE06/Submitted.pdf (accessed 6 April 2022)
 	Hundersmarck, C., Mancinelli, C., & Martelli, M. (2004). Viva la brickOS. Journal of Computing Sciences in Colleges, 19(5), 305–307. (accessed 8 May 2022)
 	Kim, S. H., & Jeon, J. W. (2006, May). Educating C language using LEGO Mindstorms robotic invention system 2.0. In Proceedings 2006 IEEE International Conference on Robotics and Automation, 2006. ICRA 2006. (pp. 715–720). IEEE. Retrieved from: http://files.team2648.com/LearnableProgramming/IEEE-C%20using%20legos.pdf (accessed 9 April 2022)
 	Mäkelä, T. (2007). Using brickOs with LEGO Mindstorms RCX brick and establishing infrared communication. Retrieved from: https://www.theseus.fi/bitstream/handle/10024/929/Makela_Tero.pdf?sequence=1 (Accessed 5 April 2022)
 	Matellán, V., Canas, J. M., & González-Careaga, R. (2003). Different robotics platforms for different teaching needs. Actas del Seminario Hispabot. Retrieved from: https://gsyc.urjc.es/~vmo/pubs/hispabot03.pdf (accessed 6 April 2022)
 	Markus L. Noga. Open-source embedded operating system for the LEGO Mindstorms. Retrieved from: http://www.noga.de/legOS/ (accessed 8 May 2022)
 	Maia, L. D. O., da Silva, V. J., Queiroz-Neto, J. P., & de Lucena, V. F. (2009, October). An experience to use robotics to improve Computer Science learning. In 2009 39th IEEE Frontiers in Education Conference (pp. 1–6). IEEE. Retrieved from: http://citeseerx.ist.psu.edu/viewdoc/download?doi=10.1.1.528.1561&rep=rep1&type=pdf  (Accessed 14 March 2022)
 	Programming Lego Mindstorms using brickOS. (2002). Retrieved from: http://user.it.uu.se/~tobiasa/RT-DI02/ass1/legos_print.html  (Accessed 18 March 2022)
 	Teslya, N., & Savosin, S. (2014, October). Smart-M3-based robot interaction in cyber-physical systems. In Proceedings of 16th Conference of Open Innovations Association FRUCT (pp. 108–114). IEEE. Retrieved from: https://www.fruct.org/publications/fruct16/files/Tes.pdf (Accessed 9 March 2022)
 	White, D. (2004). From scade to lego Mindstorms. Department of Computer Science, University of York. Retrieved from: https://citeseerx.ist.psu.edu/viewdoc/download?doi=10.1.1.467.2121&rep=rep1&type=pdf(Accessed 17 March 2022)
 	http://brickos.sourceforge.net/ (Accessed 18 March 2022)

External links
 

Embedded operating systems
Lego Mindstorms
Robot operating systems